Kamenets District is a district (raion) of Brest Region, in Belarus. Its administrative center is Kamenets.

Geography
In Kamenets District in few kilometers to the South-West from Vysokaye town on the Bug River the western extreme point of Belarus is situated.

Demographics
At the time of the Belarus Census (2009), Kamenets District had a population of 39,143. Of these, 83.2% were of Belarusian, 7.4% Ukrainian, 6.7% Russian and 1.7% Polish ethnicity. 52.1% spoke Russian and 43.0% Belarusian as their native language.

Notable residents 

 Usievalad Ihnatoŭski (1881, Takary village - 1931), Belarusian politician, scholar and the first president of the National Academy of Sciences of Belarus
 Romuald Traugutt (1826, Šastakova village – 1864), general and war hero best known for commanding the January Uprising of 1863

References

 
Districts of Brest Region